Olean can refer to:

 Olean, Indiana
 Olean, Missouri
 Olean, New York, the largest city named Olean
Olean (town), New York, a surrounding municipality
 Olestra, an artificial fat substitute
 Oleane, a defunct French internet service provider